Fred Hawkins (born July 11, 1967) is an American politician serving as a member of the Florida House of Representatives for the 42nd district. He assumed office on November 3, 2020.

Early life and education 
Hawkins was born in Ohio. He earned a B.S. degree in political science from the University of Akron.

Career 
From 2008 to 2020, Hawkins served as a commissioner for Osceola County. He also served on the planning commission for Osceola County from 1998 to 2007.

Committee assignments 

 Higher Education Appropriations Subcommittee   Vice Chair
 Education & Employment Committee   Republican Committee Whip
 Postsecondary Education & Workforce Subcommittee
 Appropriations Committee
 Local Administration, Federal Affairs & Special Districts Subcommittee

Election history

References

1967 births
Republican Party members of the Florida House of Representatives
21st-century American politicians
University of Akron alumni
Living people